Agata Ozdoba-Błach (born 25 February 1988) is a Polish judoka. She competed at the 2020 Summer Olympics, in Women's Judo 63 kg.

She won a bronze medal at the 2017 World Judo Championships in Budapest.

References

External links
 

1988 births
Living people
Polish female judoka
Place of birth missing (living people)
Universiade bronze medalists for Poland
Universiade medalists in judo
European Games competitors for Poland
Judoka at the 2015 European Games
Medalists at the 2011 Summer Universiade
Judoka at the 2019 European Games
Judoka at the 2020 Summer Olympics
Olympic judoka of Poland
21st-century Polish women